The Langley Research Center (LaRC or NASA Langley), located in Hampton, Virginia, United States of America, is the oldest of NASA's field centers. Near the Chesapeake Bay front of Langley Air Force Base . LaRC has focused primarily on aeronautical research but has also tested space hardware such as the Apollo Lunar Module. In addition, many of the earliest high-profile space missions were planned and designed on-site. Langley was also considered a potential site for NASA's Manned Spacecraft Center prior to the eventual selection of Houston, Texas.

Established in 1917 by the National Advisory Committee for Aeronautics (NACA), the research center devotes two-thirds of its programs to aeronautics and the rest to space. LaRC researchers use more than 40 wind tunnels to study and improve aircraft and spacecraft safety, performance, and efficiency. Between 1958 and 1963, when NASA (the successor agency to NACA) started Project Mercury, LaRC served as the main office of the Space Task Group.

In September 2019, after previously serving as associate director and deputy director, Clayton P. Turner was appointed director of NASA Langley.

History 

After U.S.-German relations had deteriorated from neutral to hostile around 1916, the prospect of U.S. war entry became possible. On February 15, 1917, the newly established Aviation Week warned that the U.S. military aviation capability was less than what was operating in the European war. President Woodrow Wilson sent Jerome Hunsaker to Europe to investigate, and Hunsaker's report prompted Wilson to command the creation of the nation's first aeronautics laboratory, which became NASA Langley. 

In 1917, less than three years after it was created, the NACA established the Langley Memorial Aeronautical Laboratory on Langley Field. Both Langley Field and the Langley Laboratory are named after aviation pioneer Samuel Pierpont Langley. The Aviation Section, U.S. Signal Corps had established a base there earlier that same year. The first research facilities were in place and aeronautical research was started by 1920. Initially, the laboratory included four researchers and 11 technicians.

Langley Field and NACA began parallel growth as air power proved its utility during World War I. The center was originally established to explore the field of aerodynamic research involving airframe and propulsion engine design and performance. In 1934 the world's largest wind tunnel was constructed at Langley Field with a  test section; it was large enough to test full-scale aircraft. It remained the world's largest wind tunnel until the 1940s, when a  tunnel was built at NASA's Ames Research Center in California.

The West Area Computers were African American, female mathematicians who worked as human computers at the Langley Research Center from 1943 through 1958. The West Computers were originally subject to Virginia's Jim Crow laws and got their name because they worked at Langley's West Area, while the white mathematicians worked in the East section.

Early in 1945, the center expanded to include rocket research, leading to the establishment of a flight station at Wallops Island, Virginia. A further expansion of the research program permitted Langley Research Center to orbit payloads, starting with NASA's Explorer 9 balloon satellite in mid-February 1961. As rocket research grew, aeronautics research continued to expand and played an important part when the subsonic flight was advanced and supersonic and hypersonic flight were introduced.

Langley Research Center can claim many historic firsts, some of which have proven to be revolutionary scientific breakthroughs. These accomplishments include: Development of the concept of research aircraft leading to supersonic flight, the world's first transonic wind tunnel, training the first crews of astronauts, the Lunar Landing Facility which provides the simulation of lunar gravity, and the Viking program for Mars exploration. The center also developed standards for the grooving of aircraft runways based on a previous British design used at Washington National Airport. Grooved runways reduce aquaplaning which permits better grip by aircraft tires in heavy rain. This grooving is now the international standard for all runways around the world.

Langley was also a contender for the site of NASA Mission Control, prior to the eventual selection of Houston, due to Langley's prominence with NASA at the time, the large existing aerospace industry already present in the Hampton Roads region, and the proximity to Washington, D.C. The selection of Houston actually took many higher-ups at Langley by surprise and caused some lingering controversy in the surrounding area over the loss and transfer of so many jobs to Houston. Though they had lost out on the Manned Spacecraft Center, Langley still played an important role in conducting research and training during the Apollo Program.

Aeronautics

Langley Research Center performs critical research on aeronautics, including wake vortex behavior, fixed-wing aircraft, rotary wing aircraft, aviation safety, human factors and aerospace engineering. LaRC assisted the NTSB in the investigation of the crash of American Airlines Flight 587.

Work began in July 2011 to remove the 1940s era  transonic wind tunnel. The facility supported development and propulsion integration research for many military aircraft including all fighters since 1960 (F-14, F-15, F-16, F-18 and the Joint Strike Fighter) but had been inactive since 2004. Langley retained transonic wind tunnel testing capabilities facilities in the National Transonic Facility, a high pressure, cryogenically cooled  closed loop wind tunnel.

Fabrication research and development

Electron-beam freeform fabrication (EBF³)

Electron-beam freeform fabrication (EBF3) is an additive manufacturing process that builds near-net-shape parts. Additive manufacturing encompasses processes in which parts are built by successively adding material rather than by cutting or grinding it away as in conventional machining, similar to 3d printing. In the 1990s, development was primarily done by Karen Taminger, a material research engineer at NASA LaRC. Since 2000, a team of researchers at the NASA LaRC have led the fundamental research and development of this technique for additive manufacturing for metallic aerospace structures.

Advantages of the EBF³ process include increased strength and reduced material usage. The technique has the ability to build functionally graded unitized parts directly from CAD. Recently, LaRC has become home to this type of machining process, which is used by their room-sized High Frequency , X-ray emitting electron gun (similar to Cathode Ray Tubes). This quickly melts either aluminum or titanium wire (positioned by dual independent wire feeders) into the desired 3-dimensional metallic parts with a material strength comparable to that of wrought products. Metallic parts are also built directly from CAD without molds or tools, leaving the end product with very low porosity.

Plastic fabrication

LaRC also houses a large collection of various inexpensive plastic reformation machines. These machines are used in the freeform fabrication department for faster timing, better precision, and larger quantities of low-cost toy, model, and industrial plastic parts. The fabrication of plastic parts is similar to the EBF³ process, but with a thin, grated heating element as its melting apparatus. Both are run by CAD data and deal with various freeform fabrication of raw materials.

Astronautics

Moon 

Since the start of Project Gemini, Langley was a center for training of rendezvous in space. In 1965, Langley opened the Lunar Landing Research Facility for simulations of Moon landings with a mock Apollo Lunar Module suspended from a gantry over a simulated lunar landscape. There was experimental work on some Lunar Landing Research Vehicles (LLRV).

Mars 
Langley Research Center supported NASA's mission with the designing of a spacecraft for a landing on Mars. (see the Mars Exploration Rover.)

Earth science
Langley Research Center conducts Earth science research to support NASA's mission.

Awards
LRC scientists and engineers have won the Collier Trophy 5 times, listed below.

 1929: for the development of low-drag cowling for radial air-cooled aircraft engines.
 1946: to Lewis A. Rodert, Lawrence D. Bell and Chuck Yeager for the development of an efficient wing deicing system.
 1947: to John Stack of the then Langley Memorial Aeronautical Laboratory for research to determine the physical laws affecting supersonic flight. Lawrence D. Bell and Chuck Yeager also shared in this trophy for their work on supersonic flight.
 1951: to John Stack for the development and use of the slotted-throat wind tunnel.
 1954: to Richard T. Whitcomb for the development of the Whitcomb area rule, according to the citation, a "powerful, simple, and useful method of reducing greatly the sharp increase in wing drag heretofore associated with transonic flight, and which constituted a major factor requiring great reserves of power to attain supersonic speeds."

See also
 Aerospace engineering
 NASA field centers and other facilities
 TsAGI Russia's equivalent test center and research institute

References

External links

 Langley Research Center website
 Langley Archives Collection at Cultural Resources Geographical Information Systems (CRGIS), NASA
 James R. Hansen: Spaceflight Revolution: NASA Langley Research Center from Sputnik to Apollo (NASA SP-4308, 1995)
 Crafting Flight: Aircraft Pioneers and the Contributions of the Men and Women of NASA Langley Research Center (NASA SP-2003-4316)
 Engineer in Charge: A History of the Langley Aeronautical Laboratory,1917–1958 (NASA SP-4305, 1987)
 Journey in Aeronautical Research: a Career at NASA-Langley Research Center, Monographs in Aerospace History No. 12
Historic American Engineering Record documentation (all located in Hampton, Independent City, VA):

 
Aerospace research institutes
Aviation research institutes
Buildings and structures in Hampton, Virginia
Historic American Engineering Record in Virginia
National Register of Historic Places in Hampton, Virginia
Space technology research institutes
Superfund sites in Virginia
1917 establishments in Virginia
NASA research centers